The Daily Record refers to the following newspapers:

Australia
 Daily Record (Rockhampton), a newspaper published in Rockhampton, Queensland

Scotland
 Daily Record (Scotland), a Scottish tabloid based in Glasgow

India
The Daily Records, an Indian daily news magazine based in New Delhi.

United States
 The Boston Record, a former daily newspaper published in Boston, Massachusetts
 Cañon City Daily Record, a daily newspaper in Cañon City, Colorado
 Daily Record (Arkansas), published in Little Rock
 Daily Record (Maryland), a daily business and legal newspaper published in Baltimore, Maryland
 Daily Record (New Jersey), a daily newspaper published in Morris County, New Jersey
 The Daily Record (North Carolina), a daily newspaper published in Dunn, North Carolina
 The Daily Record (Ohio), a daily newspaper published in Wooster, Ohio
 Daily Record (Washington), a daily newspaper published in Ellensburg, Washington
 Daily Record (Wilmington), an African American newspaper in Wilmington, North Carolina, that was destroyed by white supremacists during the Wilmington Insurrection of 1898
 Financial News & Daily Record, a daily financial newspaper published in Jacksonville, Florida
 Hickory Daily Record, a daily newspaper based in North Carolina
 Roswell Daily Record, a daily newspaper published in Roswell, New Mexico
 San Marcos Daily Record, a daily newspaper published in San Marcos, Texas
 York Daily Record, a daily newspaper published in York, Pennsylvania